Arnfinn Hofstad (born 16 March 1934) is a Norwegian businessperson.

Hofstad hails from Stiklestad. He took the siv.øk. degree at the Norwegian School of Economics in 1958, started working in Asbjørn Habberstad AS before being hired in Nordenfjelske Treforedling in Skogn in 1963. After a period from 1972 to 1980 as chief executive officer in Bøndernes Salgslag, he returned to the paper industry as vice chief executive in Norske Skogindustrier. He was then Norske Skog's chief executive from 1982 to 1994.

Hofstad served as chairman of the board in Telenor (retiring in 2000) and Coop NKL, and was deputy chair in Statoil from 1987 to 1997. He also served as acting chairman of Statoil in 1996. He also chaired Forenede Forsikring, Tofte Industrier, Union Co, Follum Fabrikker and Saugbrugsforeningen, and was a board member of Vår Bank og Forsikring and Landsbanken. In 2003 he was decorated as a Knight, First Class of the Order of St. Olav.

He resides in Levanger with a long-time secondary domicile in Frogner, Oslo.

References

1934 births
Living people
People from Verdal
Norwegian School of Economics alumni
Norwegian businesspeople
Norwegian cooperative organizers
Equinor people